The Federation is the Continental governing body for the sport of archery on the African Continent and is recognized by a number of international bodies, including the World Archery Federation, the African Continental Olympic Committee and the African Commonwealth Archery Committee.

Official website 
http://www.africanarchery.org

Archery in Africa
World Archery Federation
Sports governing bodies in Africa